Chris Binet (born 28 May 1937) is a Belgian former sports shooter. He competed at the 1972 Summer Olympics and the 1976 Summer Olympics.

References

1937 births
Living people
Belgian male sport shooters
Olympic shooters of Belgium
Shooters at the 1972 Summer Olympics
Shooters at the 1976 Summer Olympics
Sportspeople from Brussels
20th-century Belgian people